Ádám Dudás (born 12 February 1989) is a Hungarian footballer who played for Szombathelyi Haladás.

The right forward reached the Elite Round with the Hungarian U17 team on the UEFA U-17 Championship 2006 in Luxembourg. As a result of his performance he was chosen into the European U17 Team to play at the 2007 Meridian Cup against Africa's best eleven.

After unsuccessful trials with Arsenal and Rangers F.C., he was loaned to Spartak Moscow with prospect for a permanent deal, but in the winter 2007/2008 he returned to Győri ETO after he played only in 6 matches for Spartak reserves.

Honours

 FIFA U-20 World Cup:
Third place: 2009
Named in the Europe U-18 Team: 2007

References

External links
Rangers trial young Hungarian
Arsenal gives trial to Hungarian striker Adam Dudas
Ádám Dudás fan site (In English)
 Profile

1989 births
Living people
People from Esztergom
Hungarian footballers
Hungary youth international footballers
Association football midfielders
Győri ETO FC players
Paksi FC players
Nemzeti Bajnokság I players
Hungarian expatriate footballers
Expatriate footballers in Russia
Hungarian expatriate sportspeople in Russia
FC Spartak Moscow players
Sportspeople from Komárom-Esztergom County